Belén de Nosarita is a district of the Nicoya canton, in the Guanacaste province of Costa Rica.

History 
Belén de Nosarita was created on 17 June 1994 by Ley 7415.

Geography 
Belén de Nosarita has an area of  km² and an elevation of  metres.

Locations
Poblados: Arcos, Balsal, Caimitalito, Cuajiniquil, Cuesta Grande, Chumburán, Juntas, Maquenco, Minas, Miramar Sureste, Naranjal, Naranjalito, Nosarita, Platanillo, Quebrada Bonita, Santa Elena (part), Zaragoza

Demographics 

For the 2011 census, Belén de Nosarita had a population of  inhabitants.

Transportation

Road transportation 
The district is covered by the following road routes:
 National Route 150

References 

Districts of Guanacaste Province
Populated places in Guanacaste Province